The 1923 Ladies Open Championships was held at the Queen's Club, West Kensington in London from 7–12 November 1922.

Sylvia Huntsman won the title defeating Nancy Cave in the final. This was the second championship held during 1922 so is attributed as being the 1923 event.

Draw and results

Section A (round robin)

Section B (round robin)

+ Honourable Mrs Clarence Bruce (née Margaret Bethune Black)
++ Honourable Mrs Edward Tew (née Catherine Hawke)

Final

References

Women's British Open Squash Championships
Women's British Open Squash Championships
Women's British Open Squash Championships
Squash competitions in London
British Open Championships